Busietta is a surname. Notable people with the surname include:

 Carmelo Busietta, Maltese water polo player
 Victor Busietta, Maltese water polo player

Maltese-language surnames